Bernhard Heinrich Romberg (November 13, 1767  – August 13, 1841) was a German cellist and composer.

Life
Romberg was born in Dinklage.  His father, Anton Romberg, played the bassoon and cello and gave Bernhard his first cello lessons. He first performed in public at the age of seven. In addition to touring Europe with his cousin Andreas Romberg, Bernhard Romberg also joined the Münster Court Orchestra.

Together with his cousin, he later joined the court orchestra of the Prince Elector Archbishop of Cologne in Bonn (conducted by the Kapellmeister Andrea Luchesi) in 1790, where they met the young Beethoven. Beethoven admired and respected Bernhard Romberg as a musician.
  
Romberg made several innovations in cello design and performance. He lengthened the cello's fingerboard and flattened the side under the C string, thus giving it more freedom to vibrate. He also invented what is known as the Romberg bevel, a flat section beneath the E string of the double bass that allowed the larger string to vibrate more freely. He suggested that half-size and 3/4 size cellos should be designed to make it easier for young children to play the instrument. Romberg is responsible for simplifying cello notation to only three clefs, the bass clef, the tenor clef and the treble clef. Until his time, it was common to use many clefs for multiple uses; the 18th century cellist-composer Luigi Boccherini used as many as six clefs in his compositions. Romberg is thought to be among the first cellists to perform from memory, which was a skill praised highly in his day.  He died in Hamburg.

It has been  suggested that Romberg's cello sonata in E minor was a strong influence on the first cello sonata in E minor by Johannes Brahms.

Works

Works with Opus number
Opus 1, string quartets 1-3
String Quartet No. 1 in E-flat Major
String Quartet No. 2 in B-flat Major
String Quartet No. 3 in D Major
Opus 2, Concerto No. 1 in B-flat Major, for cello and orchestra
Opus 3, Grand Concerto No. 2 in D Major, for cello with orchestra
Opus 4, Potpourris in G Major for cello and string quartet (Also transcribed as Three Duos for violin and cello)
Opus 5, Three Sonatas for cello (or violin) and harp (or piano)
Opus 6, Concerto No. 3 in G Major, for cello and orchestra (also reduced as Three Grand Sonatas, for piano with accompaniment of violin)
Opus 7, Cello Concerto No.4 in E minor
Opus 8, Grand Trio in F Major for string trio
Opus 9, 3 duos for 2 cellos (also transcribed for violin and cello)
No.1, Duet in D Major
No.2, Duet in F major
No.3, Duet in E minor
Opus 10, Fantaisie for cello, 2 violins, viola, bass, flute, oboe, clarinet and bassoon, Berlin: Bureau de Musique de Rodolphe werckmeister, c.1806.
Opus 11, Overture for orchestra
Opus 12, Quartet No.4 (2 violins, viola, cello)
Opus 13, Variations in A Minor for cello and orchestra
Opus 14, Airs Russes for cello and orchestra
Opus 17, Flute concerto in B minor (Also published as opus 30)
Opus 18, Variations et Rondo in E-flat Major for harp (or piano), violin, viola and cello
Opus 20, Variations sur deux airs russes in D Minor for cello and strings
Opus 21, Rondoletto per violoncello principale con strings in A Major
Opus 22, Piano Quartet
Opus 23, Trauer-Symphonie in C Minor
Opus 24, Divertimento for cello, violin, viola and bass, Bonn: Simrock, c. 1830.
Opus 25, String Quartets 5-7
String Quartet No.5 in G Minor
String Quartet No.6 in  C Minor
String Quartet No.7 in G Major
Opus 26, Overture to  Opera: Ulysse et Circe
Opus 27, Divertimento sopra un tema finlandico et sueco for flute, 2 violins, viola and cello
Opus 28, Capriccio sur des aire nationaux suédois for cello and piano (also Symphony in E-flat Major)
Opus 30, Concerto No. 5 in F-sharp Minor for cello and orchestra
Opus 31, Concerto No. 6 in F Major (Militaire) for cello and orchestra
Opus 33, 2 duos for 2 cellos
Opus 34, Concert Overture
Opus 35, Elegie sur la mort d'un objet chéri for cello and string orchestra
Opus 36, Duos for 2 cellos
Opus 37, String Quartet No 8 in A Major
Opus 38, Three Sonatas for Cello and Piano (also Three Trios for viola and two cellos)
No.1, Cello Sonata in E minor
No.2,  Cello Sonata in G Major
No.3, Cello Sonata in B-flat Major
Opus 39, String Quartet No 9 in D Minor
Opus 41, Concertino in E minor for cello and orchestra
Opus 42, Divertimento on Swedish National Themes
Opus 43, 3 Sonatas (Also played as trios for viola, cello and bass). (and as duos for 2 cellos).
No.1, Cello Sonata in Bb Major
No.2,  Cello Sonata in C Major
No.3, Cello Sonata in G Major
Opus 44, Concerto No. 7 in C Major (Suisse) for cello and orchestra
Opus 46, Divertimento from Austrian Folksongs for cello and guitar
Opus 48, Concerto No. 8 in A Major (Brillant) for cello and orchestra
Opus 49, Souvenir de Vienne, grosses rondo , for cello and piano (originally with orchestra)
Opus 50, Theme and Variations for cello and piano
Opus 51, Concertino, for cello and piano or orchestra in D minor
Opus 52, – Airs Russes for cello and piano
Opus 53, Symphony in C major (published 1830 by Haslinger)
Opus 55, Fantaisie sur des airs norvégiens in D Minor for cello and piano
Opus 56 , Concerto No. 9 in B Minor (Grand) for cello and orchestra
Opus 57, Concertino for cello and orchestra
Opus 58, Fantaisie sur des airs norvégiens pour violoncelle et piano
Opus 59, String Quartet No. 10 in A Minor
Opus 60, String Quartet No. 11 in E Major
Opus 61, Theme with Variations and Rondo for cello and piano
Opus 62, Symphonie burlesque (toy symphony)
Opus 65, Divertimento on Westphalian National Themes for cello and string quartet
Opus 70, Grande fantaisie for cello accompanied by string quartet or piano
Opus 71, Divertissement for piano trio
Opus 72, Concertino in A for  two cellos and orchestra
Opus 75, Op. 75 – Concerto No. 10 in E Major (Brillant), for cello and orchestra
Opus 76, Introduction and Polonaise for cello and piano

Works by Bernhard and Andreas Romberg
Opus 1, Three Quintets for flute, violin, two violas and cello
Quintet 1 in D Major
Quintet 2 in C Major
Quintet 3 in G Major (written only by Bernhard Romberg)
Opus 2, 3 Concertante Duos for violin and cello

Works without Opus number
Oeuvres Posthumes, 6 Morceaux Élégants for cello and piano
No.1,  La réponse, Fantaisie
No.2, Divertissement
No.3, Notturno
No.4, Sérénade
No.5, Bagatella
No.6, Introduzione e Rondo giocoso
Le Rêve, pièce de fantaisie for cello and string quartet (or piano)
Two Canons
Recitative and Aria in B-flat Major for cello and orchestra
Pièce pour les amateurs sur des airs suedois for cello and string quartet
Cantabile et thème varié suivis d'un allegretto for cello and piano
Variations in A Minor for cello and orchestra
Variations in E Major for cello and piano
Trois themes de W. A. Mozart, variés pour violon et violoncelle
Double Concerto, for violin, cello, and orchestra
Divertimento sur des airs autrichiens, for cello and piano
Violoncello studies, three books
A Complete Theoretical and Practical School for the Violoncello

Media

References

External links
 
biography of Bernhard Romberg, focusing on his cello works and performance 
Romberg public domain duets scores

German classical cellists
German composers
1767 births
1841 deaths
String quartet composers